Stephen Thomas Golding (born February 8, 1984) known as Pete Golding is an American football coach who currently serves as the defensive coordinator and inside linebackers coach for Ole Miss.

Playing career
Golding was a four-year starter for the Delta State Statesmen from 2002 to 2005 at safety, racking up 285 career tackles to rank third in school history while recording nine career interceptions to finish fourth. In 2004, the free safety garnered All-Gulf South Conference honors after leading the team with 85 tackles with two interceptions and eight pass break-ups. As a senior in 2005, he tallied 81 tackles with five tackles-for-loss, two interceptions and two forced fumbles.

Coaching career
Golding began his coaching career as a graduate assistant on former Delta State head coach Rick Rhoades' staff in 2006. The Statesmen went 12–3 that season and advanced all the way to the NCAA Division II Semifinals before falling to eventual national champion Grand Valley State.

Tusculum College
Golding served for two years as defensive coordinator and defensive backs coach under Frankie DeBusk at Tusculum College, a member of the South Atlantic Conference. Prior to being named defensive coordinator in 2008, Golding served as defensive backs coach in 2007.

The Pioneers became an explosive and record-setting defensive unit under Golding's direction. In 2007, TC set a new school record for interceptions with 14 and in 2008 TC lead the SAC in sacks and turnovers forced en route to an appearance in the NCAA Division II playoffs.

Delta State
In Golding's first year back at Delta State in 2010, the Statesmen advanced to the NCAA DII National Championship game and their third Gulf South Conference title in four years with an 11–4 overall record and a 6–2 mark in the GSC. DSU fell short of their goal of winning the title on a last-second game-winning field goal by Minnesota-Duluth, 20–17.

Delta State's "Green Shirts" defense played a fast-paced and frenetic style that led the Statesmen to 19 interceptions and 27 forced fumbles. Led by Garrett Williams, who recorded 130 tackles and tied the school record interceptions in a season with eight, DSU allowed 372.7 yards per game, but bristled during the postseason surrendering less than 250 yards per game in postseason.

Under Golding's guidance, Williams closed his senior season as a unanimous All-American selection after finishing with the third highest single season tackles total in DSU history.

Southeastern Louisiana
The Hammond, Louisiana native spent two seasons as Southeastern Louisiana’s defensive coordinator. In his final year in 2013, the Lions won a program-record 11 contests, including a perfect 7–0 mark in Southland Conference play en route to their first league title since 1961. Southeastern Louisiana advanced to the quarterfinals of the Football Championship Subdivision playoffs in its first-ever appearance and his defense led the Southland in both total and scoring defense.

Southern Miss
The Golden Eagles posted a six-win improvement in his second season. Southern Miss finished 9–5 overall, won the West Division of Conference USA with a 7–1 mark and made an appearance in the Heart of Dallas Bowl in 2015.

UTSA
In his first season with the Roadrunners, he helped lead the program to six wins and its first-ever bowl game, the 2016 Gildan New Mexico Bowl. His defense set several school records, including single-season standards for tackles (934), tackles for loss (77), sacks (27) and quarterback hurries (38). Individually, linebacker Josiah Tauaefa broke UTSA's season record for tackles with 115 en route to becoming the program's first Freshman All-American (Football Writers Association of America) and collecting Conference USA Freshman of the Year and first-team all-conference honors. Defensive end Marcus Davenport and safety Michael Egwuagu were named second-team all-conference and safety Jordan Moore was honorable mention.
 
Golding's 2017 defense ranked seventh in the Football Bowl Subdivision, allowing just 287.8 yards per game. The Roadrunners also finished eighth in scoring defense (17.0 ppg), second in first downs defense (166) and 19th in pass efficiency defense (112.19). UTSA's improvement during Golding's tenure was evident, as the Roadrunners allowed 156 less yards per game and 16.8 less point per game in 2017 compared 2015.

Alabama
University of Alabama head coach Nick Saban announced the hiring of Pete Golding on December 15, 2017, to serve as a defensive assistant for the Crimson Tide in 2018. Golding was traveling with the Crimson Tide for the College Football Playoff. For the 2018 season Golding was the Co-Defensive Coordinator/Inside Linebackers for the Tide.

He was promoted to defensive coordinator in February 2019. However he struggled during the 2019 season.

In 2020 he was a part of the coaching staff during the Tide's national championship campaign.

In February 2022, Golding was arrested by Northport, Alabama police and charged with driving under the influence.

Ole Miss
On January 13, 2023, Ole Miss announced that Golding had been hired as the new Defensive Coordinator for the Rebels.

References

External links
 Alabama profile

Living people
American football safeties
Alabama Crimson Tide football coaches
Delta State Statesmen football coaches
Delta State Statesmen football players
Ole Miss Rebels football coaches
Southeastern Louisiana Lions football coaches
Southern Miss Golden Eagles football coaches
Tusculum Pioneers football coaches
UTSA Roadrunners football coaches
Sportspeople from Hammond, Louisiana
1984 births